Delhi Private School, Sharjah (DPS Sharjah) is a KG1–12 private school in Sharjah, United Arab Emirates. It is affiliated with the Central Board of Secondary Education. It is the first school in the United Arab Emirates to have branched out from its parent institute, Delhi Public School.

In 2014, the school was awarded the "Sharjah Environment Awareness Award for Educational and Institutional Performance" (2013–14), given by the Ministry of Education and the Sharjah Education Zone. On 5 May 2014, the school was awarded the Green Flag by the committees of the Emirates Wildlife Society (EWS-WWF) in association with World Wide Fund for Nature (WWF).

Educational system and co-curricular activities 
The school follows the Central Board of Secondary Education (CBSE) curriculum; it offers education to students from KG1 to class 12. In 2005, DPS Sharjah had introduced the Comprehensive Learning Program (CLP), an online tool where parents and students can access assignments and extra learning material that are uploaded on a monthly basis. Grades 6-8 have Periodic Tests and Summative Assessments, and grades 10 and 12 have Pre-board examinations and Board examinations from CBSE Board.

The school also adopted the CCE (Continuous and Comprehensive Evaluation) program and introduced ECL dashboard effective classroom learning. In the Middle and Senior levels the school follows the CCE pattern till Grade X.

DPS Sharjah has adapted an online mode of learning during the COVID-19 pandemic.

References

External links 
 

Private schools in the United Arab Emirates
International schools in Sharjah (city)
Indian international schools in the United Arab Emirates
Schools in Sharjah (city)
Educational institutions established in 2000
2000 establishments in the United Arab Emirates